Dhruba Esh (born 7 January 1967) is a Bangladeshi cover artist and writer. He has designed a number of the most notable covers including Humayun Ahmed's Himu and Misir Ali series. He won 2022 Bangla Academy Literary Award for his contribution to children's literature.

Early life
Esh was born on 7 January 1967 at Sunamganj District of the then East Pakistan (now Bangladesh) to Bhupati Ranjan Esh and Leela Esh. He graduated from University of Dhaka in fine arts.

Career
Esh started his career as a cover artist in 1989 when he was a second-year student of Dhaka University. Initially, he used to cover the book of Imdadul Haque Milan. He was later introduced to Humayun Ahmed by other publishers and started designing book covers for him in 1990s. In an interview with The Daily Star in February 2019, he said that he has designed close to 25,000 book covers in his career.

Awards
 Panjeree Chotokaku Ananda Alo Shishu Shahitya Award (2019)
 Bangla Academy Literature Award for Children's Literature (2022)

References

Living people
1967 births
People from Sunamganj District
University of Dhaka alumni
Cover artists
Bangladeshi male writers
Recipients of Bangla Academy Award